California's 23rd congressional district is a congressional district in the U.S. state of California. The district is represented in the 118th United States Congress by Jay Obernolte.

Following the 2020 United States redistricting cycle, the district is anchored in San Bernardino County, and also includes parts of Kern and Los Angeles counties. It is mostly within the Mojave Desert. Cities in the new 23rd district include Victorville, Hesperia, Adelanto, Apple Valley, Barstow, Twentynine Palms, Big Bear Lake, California City, Loma Linda, Yucaipa, southern Redlands, and small portions of Highland and San Bernardino.

Former characteristics
From 2003 to 2013 the district ran along the Pacific coasts of Ventura, Santa Barbara, and San Luis Obispo counties. Major cities in the district included Santa Barbara, San Luis Obispo, Ventura, and Oxnard.
Before redistricting by the California Citizens Redistricting Commission in 2011, California's 23rd congressional district was one of the narrowest districts in the United States, stretching along the Pacific coast from Oxnard to the Monterey County line. It was often referred to as "the district that disappears at high tide" or the "ribbon of shame". This area is now divided between the 24th and 26th districts, while the current 23rd covers much of the territory that was previously in the 22nd district.

Election results from statewide races

Composition

As of the 2020 redistricting, California's 23rd congressional district is located in the region of the state covering the Mojave Desert. It encompasses the majority of San Bernardino, and parts of Kern and Los Angeles Counties.

San Bernardino County is split between this district, the 25th district, the 28th district, the 33rd district, and the 40th district. The 23rd, 28th and 33rd are partitioned by San Bernardino National Forest, Manzanita Rd, Highway 15, Cajon Blvd, W Kenwood Ave, Highway 215, W Meyers Rd, Ohio Ave, Pine Ave, Bailey act, Highway 206, Devils Canyon Rd, Cloudland Truck Trail, Cloudland Cutoff, Hill Dr, W 54th St, E Hill Dr, Bonita Vista Dr, Sterling Ave, Argyle Ave, E Marshall Blvd, Rockford Ave, Lynwood Dr, La Praix St, Orchid Dr, Denair Ave, Highland Ave,   Orchard Rd, Arroyo Vista Dr, Church St,   Greensport Rd, Florida St, Garnet St, Nice Ave, Crafton Ave, 5th Ave,   Walnut St, 6th Ave, S Wabash Ave,   E Citrus Ave, N Church St, Southern California Regional Rail A, Tennessee St, Highway 10, California St, E Washington St, and S Barton Rd. The 23rd and 25th are partitioned by Power Line Rd, Telephone Pole Line Rd, Cadiz Rd, Arizona & California Rail, San Bernardino National Forest, East Mojave Heritage Trail, Sunflower Springs Spur, Sunflower Springs Rd, Needles Freeway, Mountain Springs Rd, Goffs Rd, and Walter Rd. The 23rd district takes in the cities of Victorville, Barstow, Twentynine Palms, Adelanto, Yucaipa, Loma Linda, and Apple Valley, as well as the town of Yucca Valley.

Kern County is split between this district and the 20th district. They are partitioned by the Mojave-Barstow Highway, Treescape Rd, Oak Creek Rd, Anajanette Ave, 70th St W, Highway 58, Homer Hansen Private Rd, Aerospace Highway, Redrock Randsburgs Rd, Garlock Rd, Iron Canyon, and Union Pacific. The 23rd district takes in the city of California City.

Los Angeles County is split between this district, the 27th district, and the 28th district. They are partitioned by Angeles National Forest, Linda Mesa Rd, San Gabriel Mountains, Fort Tejon Rd, 121st St E, 123rd St E, 126th St E,   Highway N6, Highway 138, 136th St E, Longview Rd, E Avenue S, 140th St E, E Avenue H, 120th St E. The 23rd district takes in the census-designated place Lake Los Angeles.

Cities & CDP with 10,000 or more people
 Victorville - 134,810
 Apple Valley - 75,791
 Yucaipa - 53,921
 Adelanto - 38,046
 Twentynine Palms - 26,073
 Barstow - 25,415
 Loma Linda - 24,791
 Yucca Valley - 21,777
 California City - 14,973
 Lake Los Angeles - 11,926

List of members representing the district

Election results

1942

1944

1946

1948

1950

1952

1954

1956

1958

1960

1962

1963 (Special)

1964

1966

1968

1970

1972

1974

1976

1978

1980

1982

1984

1986

1988

1990

1992

1994

1996

1998

2000

2002

2004

2006

2008

2010

2012

2014

2016

2018

2020

Kevin McCarthy was redistricted to California's 20th congressional district prior to the 2022 election.

2022

See also
List of United States congressional districts

References

External links
GovTrack.us: California's 23rd congressional district
RAND California Election Returns: District Definitions
California Voter Foundation map - CD23

23
Government of Kern County, California
Government of Los Angeles County, California
Government of San Bernardino County, California
Mojave Desert
Constituencies established in 1943
1943 establishments in California